Limnophora is a genus of flies, belonging to the family Muscidae. The flies are characterized by silver bands across their thorax. The tribe Limnophorini is named from the genus.

The genus includes the following species:
Limnophora corvina (Giglio-Tos, 1893)
Limnophora discreta Stein, 1898
Limnophora femorata (Malloch, 1913)
Limnophora garrula (Giglio-Tos, 1893)
Limnophora groenlandica Malloch, 1920
Limnophora incrassata Malloch, 1919
Limnophora invada Huckett, 1966
Limnophora minuscula (Wulp, 1896)
Limnophora narona Walker
Limnophora nigripes (Robineau-Desvoidy, 1830)
Limnophora normata Bigot, 1885
Limnophora rotundata (Collin, 1930)
Limnophora sinuata Collin, 1930
Limnophora uniseta Stein, 1916

References

Muscomorph flies of Europe
Muscidae genera
Taxa named by Jean-Baptiste Robineau-Desvoidy